Constitución is Spanish for "constitution" and may refer to:

Geography
Argentina
Constitución, Buenos Aires, a neighborhood in central Buenos Aires, where the Estación Constitución railway station is located
Constitución Department, Santa Fe, an administrative subdivision of Santa Fe Province
Constitución railway station, a railway station and subway station in Buenos Aires
Constitución (Line C Buenos Aires Underground)
Constitución (Line E Buenos Aires Underground)
Villa Constitución, a city in Santa Fe Province and head town of the Constitución Department

Chile
Constitución, Chile

Mexico
Ciudad Constitución, in Baja California Sur

Peru
Ciudad Constitución, Peru

Ships
 Chilean battleship Constitución (1903), laid down in the UK for Chile, but purchased by the UK and renamed HMS Swiftsure